Mariano Azuela Güitrón (born 1 April 1936 in Mexico City) is a Mexican jurist who was a member of the Supreme Court of Justice of the Nation (SCJN) from 1983 to 2009 and served as its president (chief justice) from 2003 to 2007.

Personal life and education
Güitrón is the son of Mariano Azuela Rivera – who also served as a Minister of the Supreme Court (Associate Justice) – and María de los Dolores Güitrón Machaen; he is also the grandson of Mariano Azuela González, a prominent novelist of the Mexican Revolutionary period. He is married to Consuelo Bohigas Lomelín.  Azuela graduated with a bachelor's degree in law from the National Autonomous University of Mexico (UNAM) in 1959.

Judicial career
Azuela Güitrón served as magistrate (1971 – 1983) and president (1981) of the Fiscal Tribunal of the Federation.  He was a long-serving member of the faculty at the Ibero-American University in Mexico City, which he joined in 1963.

In 1983 he joined the Supreme Court of Justice of the Nation and from January 2003 to January 2006 served as its president (chief justice).

References

1936 births
Living people
20th-century Mexican judges
Supreme Court of Justice of the Nation justices
People from Mexico City
National Autonomous University of Mexico alumni
Presidents of the Supreme Court of Justice of the Nation
21st-century Mexican judges